Ignazio Colnaghi (2 February 1924 – 25 November 2017) was an Italian actor. He mainly voiced Calimero for the Italian advertising show Carosello.

References 

1924 births
2017 deaths
Italian male film actors
Italian male stage actors
Italian male television actors
Italian expatriates in the United States
Male actors from Milan